Carol-Ann Schindel is a former Republican member of the Ohio House of Representatives, representing the 63rd District from 2007 to 2008.

External links
Profile on the Ohio Ladies' Gallery website

Living people
Republican Party members of the Ohio House of Representatives
Women state legislators in Ohio
21st-century American politicians
21st-century American women politicians
Year of birth missing (living people)